St. Thomas' High School is a private Catholic primary and secondary school, located in Jhelum, a city in the Jhelum District of the Punjab province of Pakistan.

History
It was founded by Sr. Maureen Costelloe of the Presentation Sisters under the Roman Catholic Archdiocese of Lahore in 1984. It started as a boys' school but is now co-educational with a girls' section and a boys' section. It provides education up to matriculation standard. The principal in 2008 was Sr. Riffat.

The Presentation Convent School, Jhelum was set up in 1950. Sr. Maureen saw the need for a senior school for Christian boys as the boys from Presentation Primary School had nowhere to go when they finished class 5. For this purpose St. Thomas' High School was built.

See also

 Christianity in Pakistan
 Education in Pakistan
 List of educational institutions in Jhelum

References

Educational institutions established in 1984
Education in Jhelum
Presentation Sisters schools
Catholic elementary and primary schools in Pakistan
Catholic secondary schools in Pakistan
Schools in Punjab, Pakistan
1984 establishments in Pakistan